Ryan Louwrens (born 12 March 1991) is a South African Australian professional rugby union player currently playing as a scrum-half for the Melbourne Rebels in the Super Rugby. Formerly with the Western Force (Super Rugby), based in the city he migrated to as a teenager, Louwrens has also played with the Perth Spirit, the Kintetsu Liners of the Japanese Top League and the Austin Gilgronis in the Major League Rugby (MLR).

Early life
Louwrens was born in Johannesburg, South Africa where he attended Kempton Park High School in Johannesburg. When he was 16 years old, he moved with his parents to Australia where he attended Churchlands Senior High School in Perth. He was invited to join the RugbyWA Academy in 2008. In 2009, he returned to South Africa where he played at the Craven Week tournament and represented Valke at the Under 19 Currie Cup. Near the end of that season he failed a drugs test and was banned for two years by the South African Rugby Union's disciplinary tribunal for using anabolic steroids.

Career
In Perth, Louwrens was given a second chance and he began playing rugby for the Cottesloe club before rejoining the RugbyWA Academy in 2011. He went on to play for the Force ‘A’ team in 2012 and 2013, and played for the Western Force in their 2013 pre-season trial against Tonga XV. Louwrens was also a member of Cottesloe's grand final team in 2013. He signed an Extended Playing Squad contract with the Western Force for the 2014 season.

Louwrens played for the Force in their 2014 pre-season trial matches against a Samoa XV and the Pampas XV. He also started in all three matches for Force A in the 2014 Pacific Rugby Cup, scoring a try against Junior Japan. Soon after, he incurred a knee injury in training which required an anterior cruciate ligament reconstruction that ended his season.

In May 2015, he made his Super Rugby debut for the Force off the bench against the Chiefs at Hamilton. He scored two tries in the team's upset home win over the NSW Waratahs two weeks later at nib Stadium.

Louwrens has signed for the Melbourne Rebels for the 2020 Super Rugby season.

Super Rugby statistics

References

1991 births
Australian rugby union players
South African rugby union players
Western Force players
Perth Spirit players
Rugby union scrum-halves
Doping cases in rugby union
South African emigrants to Australia
Living people
Expatriate rugby union players in Japan
Hanazono Kintetsu Liners players
Melbourne Rebels players
Austin Gilgronis players
Rugby union players from Johannesburg